This is a list of islands and islets of Occupied areas of Cyprus (Northern Cyprus).

Largest islands by location and (decimal) coordinates

References 

Islands
Northern Cyprus
Islands